Notioplusia is a genus of moths of the family Noctuidae.

Species
 Notioplusia illustrata Guenée, 1852

References
 Natural History Museum Lepidoptera genus database
 Notioplusia at funet.fi

Plusiinae